Yuriy Hroshev (born 16 May 1976, in Ukrainian SSR) is a Ukrainian former footballer and current manager. He is currently the head coach of Florești. He also holds Moldovan citizenship as Iurie Groșev.

References
 Moldova.sports.md
 Молдавский отряд украинцев

1976 births
Living people
People from Berdychiv
Ukrainian footballers
FC Hoverla Uzhhorod players
FC Nistru Otaci players
FC Kryvbas Kryvyi Rih players
FC Dacia Chișinău players
FC Sfîntul Gheorghe players
Moldovan football managers
Ukrainian football managers
Association football midfielders
Association football defenders
Moldovan Super Liga players
Moldovan Super Liga managers
FC Sfîntul Gheorghe managers
FC Academia Chișinău managers
FC Nistru Otaci managers
FC Dinamo-Auto Tiraspol managers
FC Florești managers
Sportspeople from Zhytomyr Oblast